Naryn is a city in Kyrgyzstan.

Naryn may also refer to:

Geography
Naryn (river), a river in Kyrgyzstan and Uzbekistan
Naryn (Irtysh), a river in northeastern Kazakhstan
Naryn Region, an administrative division of Kyrgyzstan 
Naryn District, an administrative division of Kyrgyzstan
Naryn, Jalal-Abad, a village in Jalal-Abad Region, Kyrgyzstan
Naryn, Dzhidinsky District, Republic of Buryatia, a town in Russia

Other
Naryn (dish), a dish in Central Asian cuisine
Naryn castle (Meybod), in Iran
Naryn castle (Nain), in Iran